Sarah Mintz (born Maritza Rodríguez Gómez; September 1, 1975 in Barranquilla, Colombia) is a Colombian telenovela actress and model. In January 2018, she announced that she had changed her name to Sarah Mintz.

She is best known for her roles as Bárbara Santana in Telemundo’s telenovela Amantes del desierto (2001), Cristal Covarrubias in Venevisión's telenovela Ángel Rebelde (2003), as Marfil Mondragon de Irázabal; Deborah Mondragón de Dávila in Venevisión's telenovela Acorralada (2007), Sara Andrade in Telemundo's telenovela El Rostro de Analía (2008), Pilar and Raquel Arismendi in Telemundo's telenovela La Casa de al Lado (2011), Antonia Villarroel in Telemundo's telenovela El Rostro de la Venganza (2012), Teresa Cristina Palmer in Telemundo's telenovela Marido En Alquiler (2013), and Silvana Rivapalacios in Telemundo's telenovela Silvana sin lana (2016).

Personal life
Mintz has three siblings. She speaks English and Spanish. She has been married since June 2005 to Jewish Mexican TV executive Joshua Mintz. She currently lives in Jerusalem, Israel. Mintz announced on November 11, 2013 on Telemundo's Al Rojo Vivo that she and her husband were expecting twins. On April 13, 2014, she gave birth to twin boys, Akiva and Yehuda.

Filmography

Film

Television

Awards and nominations

References

External links
 
 

1975 births
Living people
Colombian television actresses
Colombian telenovela actresses
Converts to Judaism from Roman Catholicism
Colombian Jews